Ayder Muzhdabaev (born 8 March 1972, Tambov, RSFSR) is a Ukrainian Crimean Tatar journalist. He is a regular columnist at Ukrainska Pravda and serves as the deputy director of the ATR television channel. Muzhdabaev is one of the authors of the report Putin. War published after the assassination of Boris Nemtsov and is involved in the Free Russia Forum.

While he was based in Russia, Muzhdabaev served as a correspondent in the politics section of Moskovskij Komsomolets from 1998 to 2015. In 2015 he left his position and moved to Ukraine, due to the Russo-Ukrainian War. Muzhdabaev's support for Ukraine’s territorial integrity, which he routinely expressed on the daily talk show that he cohosted, has led to criminal charges against him in Russia.

Biography 
Ayder Muzhdabaev was born in Tambov in 1972 to Izzet Muzhdabaev and Tatyana Muzhdabaeva. His paternal ancestors hailed from Karasubazar in Crimea (now Bilohirsk) prior to the deportation of the Crimean Tatars. Family lore holds that they were related to Ismail Gasprinsky.

Muzhdabaev holds Ukrainian citizenship since 2016. Since October 2017 he hosts the "Prime: Muzhdabaev" program on the ATR television channel.

During the 2019 presidential elections in Ukraine, he supported Petro Poroshenko and spoke out against Volodymyr Zelensky believing his policies (and his voters) to be dangerously pro-Russian.

Notes

References

External links 
 Mujdabayev's column in Ukrainska Pravda (in Ukrainian).
 Putin. War 
 Official page on the ATR television channel website.
 Mujdabayev's publications in Moskovskij Komsomolets (in Russian).
 .

1972 births
Crimean Tatar journalists
21st-century Ukrainian journalists
ATR (TV channel) people
Living people